My Girlfriend's Boyfriend is an American 1998 screwball comedy film written and directed by Kenneth Schapiro, with singer-songwriter Deborah Gibson as the top-billed star. It was filmed on Long Island.

Plot
Gay soap actor Cliff (Chris Bruno) is about to marry an unsuspecting girl (Linda Larkin) for the sake of his image, to the chagrin of his boyfriend Wes (Jack Koenig). However, a prowling reporter (Deborah Gibson) has some interesting photographs which could cause general consternation.

The main romance is between the reporter Melissa and the maid of honor's uncoordinated date Jake (Sean Runnette).

Cast

Music
Singer-songwriter Deborah Gibson sang the theme tune.

External links

1998 films
1998 romantic comedy films
1990s screwball comedy films
1998 LGBT-related films
American LGBT-related films
American screwball comedy films
American independent films
LGBT-related romantic comedy films
1990s English-language films
1990s American films